Sally Casswell  is a New Zealand academic, and as of 2019 is a full professor at the Massey University. She is a member of the WHO Expert Advisory Panel on Drug Dependence and Alcohol Problems and is chair of the Scientific Advisory Board of the Global Alcohol Policy Alliance. She is a Fellow of the Royal Society of New Zealand and an Officer of the Order of New Zealand.

Academic career

After a 1974 PhD titled  'Acute effects of cannabis intoxication'  at the University of Otago, Casswell moved to Massey University, rising to full professor.

Much of Casswell's work involves the public-health psychology, including issues such as alcohol regulation, recreational drug regulation and sugar taxes. She has argued in favour of a greater contribution of multinational alcohol companies to the costs of alcohol-related harms.

Selected works 
 Beaglehole, Robert, Ruth Bonita, Richard Horton, Cary Adams, George Alleyne, Perviz Asaria, Vanessa Baugh et al. "Priority actions for the non-communicable disease crisis." The Lancet 377, no. 9775 (2011): 1438–1447.
 Moodie, Rob, David Stuckler, Carlos Monteiro, Nick Sheron, Bruce Neal, Thaksaphon Thamarangsi, Paul Lincoln, Sally Casswell, and Lancet NCD Action Group. "Profits and pandemics: prevention of harmful effects of tobacco, alcohol, and ultra-processed food and drink industries." The lancet 381, no. 9867 (2013): 670–679.
 Casswell, Sally, and Thaksaphon Thamarangsi. "Reducing harm from alcohol: call to action." The Lancet 373, no. 9682 (2009): 2247–2257.
 Connolly, Gary M., Sally Casswell, JIA‐FANG ZHANG, and Phil A. Silva. "Alcohol in the mass media and drinking by adolescents: a longitudinal study." Addiction 89, no. 10 (1994): 1255–1263.
 Casswell, Sally, Megan Pledger, and Rhonda Hooper. "Socioeconomic status and drinking patterns in young adults." Addiction 98, no. 5 (2003): 601–610.
 Casswell, Sally, Megan Pledger, and Sarah Pratap. "Trajectories of drinking from 18 to 26 years: identification and prediction." Addiction 97, no. 11 (2002): 1427–1437.

References

External links
 

Living people
New Zealand women academics
Year of birth missing (living people)
University of Otago alumni
Academic staff of the Massey University
New Zealand psychologists
New Zealand women psychologists
Fellows of the Royal Society of New Zealand
Officers of the New Zealand Order of Merit
New Zealand women writers